Santisteban is a Spanish-language surname. Notable people with the surname include:

Anna Santisteban (1914–2003), Puerto Rican businesswoman
Juan Santisteban (born 1936), Spanish footballer and manager
Fernando Silva Santisteban (1929–2006), Peruvian historian, anthropologist, and academic

See also
Santisteban del Puerto, city in the province of Jaén, Spain

Spanish-language surnames